Umali is a Filipino surname. Notable people with the surname include:
 Bianca Umali (born 2000), Filipina actress, model and dancer
 Dioscoro L. Umali (1917–1992), Filipino scientist 
 Marie-Ann Umali, Filipina beauty pageant contestant
 Mariz Umali (born c. 1979/1980), Filipina television news anchor and journalist 
 Tonisito Umali (born 1970), Filipino government official